Ndiapo Letsholathebe (born 25 February 1983) is a Botswana footballer who plays for Police XI in the Mascom Premier League.

References

External links

1983 births
Living people
Botswana footballers
Botswana Police XI SC players
Botswana international footballers
2012 Africa Cup of Nations players
Association football defenders